Hank Murphy may refer to:

Hank Murphy, a character on Sealab 2021
Hank "Halloween" Murphy, a character in the Cars film series, see List of Cars characters
Hank Murphy, a character in the 1994 film Angels in the Outfield

See also
Henry Murphy (disambiguation)